Seven Thunders (US title: The Beasts of Marseilles) is a 1957 black and white British film regarding Marseille in the Second World War. It was directed by Hugo Fregonese and starring Stephen Boyd, James Robertson Justice, Kathleen Harrison, Tony Wright and Anna Gaylor. It is about two escaped prisoners of war and is based on a novel of the same name by the writer Rupert Croft-Cooke.

Plot
In 1943, Dave (Stephen Boyd), an officer, and Jim (Tony Wright), escape from separate prison camps and are paired together by the underground. They are taken to Marseille by a fishing boat captain to wait in the Old Port Quarter for the right opportunity to try for Britain. While they wait, local woman Lise (Anna Gaylor) falls in love with Dave. He is attracted to her, but is engaged.

As a sub-plot, Emile Blanchard (Eugene Deckers) refers those desperate to leave France to his associate Dr. Martout (James Robertson Justice), unaware Martout is a serial killer who grows rich from his crimes (this character parallels the real life French poisoner Marcel Petiot). Jewish undertaker Schlip and ex-Vichy official Bourdin (George Coulouris) become his latest victims during the film.

Given an ultimatum by his displeased superiors to do something about the French Resistance, the German military commander of the city decides to evacuate and demolish the crime-infested Old Quarter, where Dave and Jim are hiding, with only two hours' warning. Dave wants to wait for the fishing captain, but Jim chooses to try Dr. Martout. When the captain does show up, Dave goes to fetch Jim, barely saving him from becoming Martout's 100th victim. Martout escapes in his car, but in his haste, crashes and is killed. With buildings blowing up right and left, the pair make their way, with Lise's help, to the boat and freedom. Aboard the boat, Dave and Lise embrace.

Cast
Stephen Boyd as Dave
James Robertson Justice as Dr. Martout
Kathleen Harrison as Mme. Abou, a helpful Englishwoman married to a Frenchman
Tony Wright as Jim
Anna Gaylor as Lise
Eugene Deckers as Emile Blanchard
Rosalie Crutchley as Therese Blanchard, Emile's wife. She tries to commit suicide when her young daughter is killed by mistake.
Katherine Kath as Mme. Parfait
James Kenney as Eric Triebel, a young German corporal who accidentally shoots the Blanchards' child 
Anton Diffring as Colonel Trautman
Martin Miller as Schlip
George Coulouris as Bourdin
Carl Duering as Major Grautner
Edric Connor as Abou

Production
It was part of a two picture deal Daniel Angel signed with Rank the other being Carve Her Name with Pride. Stephen Boyd was loaned to Rank by 20th Century Fox. Filming started in March 1957.

It was shot at Pinewood Studios and on location in Marseille. The film's sets were designed by the art director Arthur Lawson.

The associate producer, John Brabourne, got along so well with director Hugo Fresene that they collaborated again on Harry Black.

Reception
Variety said "Despite some loose ends and improbabilities it adds up to sound entertainment with a strong climax that will have patrons eagerly urging on the heroes to safety. ‘Seven Thunders' suggests’ solid home-market business, but neither the wartime setting in Europe nor the strong but far from starry cast are likely to excite U. S. patrons overmuch. "

References

External links

British black-and-white films
Films directed by Hugo Fregonese
Films set in Marseille
World War II prisoner of war films
Films about the French Resistance
Films scored by Antony Hopkins
Films shot at Pinewood Studios
British serial killer films
1950s English-language films
1950s British films